Matt Richard Klinger (born 17 July 1979) is a Canadian former professional tennis player.

Born in Toronto, Ontario, Klinger is the son of a world ranked men's high jumper who fled communist Poland. 

Klinger featured mostly on the ITF Circuit during his time on tour but made the final qualifying round of the 2003 Canada Masters in Montreal. He featured in a 2003 Davis Cup tie against Peru in Calgary, serving 27 aces to beat Willy Lock in straight sets. Before competing professionally he played collegiate tennis for Arizona State University.

ITF Futures finals

Singles: 1 (0–1)

Doubles: 5 (1–4)

See also
List of Canada Davis Cup team representatives

References

External links
 
 
 

1979 births
Living people
Canadian male tennis players
Arizona State Sun Devils men's tennis players
Tennis players from Toronto
Canadian people of Polish descent